Takawira Rural District Council is rural local authority created under the Rural District Councils Act Chapter 29.13 as provided by the constitution. It is bestored with wide ranging administrative and legislative powers
over their respective jurisdictions through this Act.

It is Chirumhanzu Rural District authority. Chirumhanzu District is rural with Mvuma being the only urban setup in the District.

Background

Chirumanzu Rural District Council was established through
Proclamation No. 1 of 1993 which amalgamated
Takawira District Council and Charter Rural Council and established new boundaries for the district.

Chirumhanzu Rural District Council has the communal area, the resettlement area and three urban areas, Mvuma, Lalapanzi and Charandura under its jurisdiction.

The three urbanized centers do not have town councils. Instead Chirumhanzu RDC now officially called Takawira RDC has set committees to run the three centers; 
 Mvuma Area Committee;

Lalapanzi Area Committee; 

Charandura Area Committee.

The district comprises  twenty five wards; that is 12 in the communal area, 3 in Mvuma, 1 in Lalapanzi and 9 in resettlement areas.

Operations

Takawira RDC comprises Chirumanzu Constituency and the greater part of Chirumanzu-Zibagwe Constituency.

Chirumanzu Cinstituency covers 13 wards 1, 2, 3, 4, 5, 6, 7, 8, 9, 10,21, 23 and 25. 
Chirumanzu-Zibagwe Constituency covers twelve of Takawira RDC wards; 11, 12, 13, 14, 15, 16, 17, 18, 19, 20, 22 and 24. However Chirumanzu-Zibagwe Constituency overlaps into Kwekwe Rural District Council taking wards 1, 2 and 31, these include Marivale, Sebakwe Recreational and Munyati respectively. These 3 wards were previously in Zhombe Constituency.

2013 - 2018 Councillors

2008 - 2013 Councillors

Winners of the 2008 Local Authorities election.

See also

 Chirumanzu-Zibagwe
 Zibagwe Rural District Council

External links

 Chirumanzu Home page

References

Districts of Zimbabwe